Babanusa is a town in western Sudan.

History 
In 1965, 72 Dinka civilians were massacred in the town by an Arab mob during the First Sudanese Civil War.

Climate

Transport 

It is a railway junction on the national railway network where the line to Waw in South Sudan branches off to the south from the line westwards to Nyala.

See also 

 Railway stations in Sudan

References 

Populated places in South Kordofan
Massacres in 1965